V6 is a silver level dance pattern of the quickstep International Standard Ballroom dance syllabus. The couple moves diagonally to the center (DC) and then diagonally to the wall (DW), thus sweeping a V-shape on the floor.

Footwork
The pattern starts with the leader backing DC, e.g., after the first part of the quarter turns: the back lock (SQQS) is performed, followed by the change of the direction on counts SQQ (leader's steps: left foot back (follower steps outside partner), right foot back with a quarter turn to the left, left foot forward facing DW), followed by a slow step outside partner, e.g., into the forward lock (SQQS). Essentially a back lock followed by an outside change.

Leader (man)

Follower (lady)

Preceding and following figures

Possible preceding figures: Anything ending with Man's weight on left foot, backing diagonal centre - such as:
"SQQ" of the quarter turns
Natural spin turn (SQQSSS) ending DC, the last S being the first S of the V6.
Possible following figures: Anything beginning with the man's step on right foot outside partner, such as:
Forward lock step
Forward pepperpot
Left scatter chasses

References

Social dance steps
Quickstep